Eduardo Fernandes Amorim (born 30 November 1950), is a Brazilian professional football coach and former player. His professional playing career as a midfielder spanned nearly 20 years, during which he was mainly associated with Corinthians and Cruzeiro, where he won the 1976 Copa Libertadores.

Honours

Player
Cruzeiro
Campeonato Mineiro: 1972, 1973, 1974, 1975, 1977
Copa Libertadores: 1976

Corinthians
Campeonato Paulista: 1982, 1983

Manager
Corinthians
Campeonato Paulista: 1995
Copa do Brasil: 1995

References

1950 births
Living people
People from Montes Claros
Brazilian footballers
Association football midfielders
Cruzeiro Esporte Clube players
Sport Club Corinthians Paulista players
Esporte Clube Santo André players
Brazilian football managers
Campeonato Brasileiro Série A managers
Sport Club Corinthians Paulista managers
Clube Atlético Mineiro managers
Sport Club do Recife managers
América Futebol Clube (RN) managers
Kalamata F.C. managers
Apollon Pontou FC managers
Brazilian expatriate football managers
Brazilian expatriate sportspeople in Greece
Expatriate football managers in Greece
Sportspeople from Minas Gerais